The 1981 Tour of the Basque Country was the 21st edition of the Tour of the Basque Country cycle race and was held from 6 April to 10 April 1981. The race was won by Silvano Contini of the Bianchi team.

General classification

References

1981
Bas